Cross-country skiing at the 2013 Winter Universiade was held at the Stadio del Fondo di Lago di Tesero in Tesero from December 12 to December 21, 2013.

Men's events

Women's events

Mixed events

Medal table

External links
Official results at the universiadetrentino.org.

2013 in cross-country skiing
Cross-country skiing
Cross-country skiing competitions in Italy
2013